Sterca-Şuluţiu was the surname of two ethnic Romanian Transylvanian brothers:

Alexandru Sterca-Șuluțiu (1794–1867), Greek-Catholic bishop
Ioan Sterca-Șuluțiu (1796–1858), 1848 revolutionary

Romanian-language surnames
Compound surnames